Lars Miedema (born 6 March 2000) is a Dutch professional footballer who plays as a forward for Tercera División club Vélez CF. He is the brother of Arsenal W.F.C. player Vivianne Miedema.

Career
Born in De Wolden, Miedema grew up in the town of Hoogeveen. After playing for Jong PEC Zwolle, he joined FC Den Bosch in September 2019. He made his debut for the club on 20 September 2019 in a 4–0 win at home to MVV Maastricht.

In January 2021, he signed for Spanish side Vélez CF.

Personal life
His sister is fellow professional footballer Vivianne Miedema, who plays for FA WSL club Arsenal and the Netherlands women's national football team. He and his sister both support Feyenoord.

Career statistics

References

External links
 
 

2000 births
Living people
Dutch footballers
Association football forwards
Footballers from Drenthe
People from De Wolden
PEC Zwolle players
FC Den Bosch players
Vélez CF players
Eerste Divisie players
Dutch expatriate footballers
Expatriate footballers in Spain
Dutch expatriate sportspeople in Spain